Arief may refer to:

Surname:
A. Hamid Arief (1924–1992), Indonesian actor who appeared in more than 120 films
Basrief Arief (1947–2021), Indonesian prosecutor, Attorney General of Indonesia
Zaenal Arief (born 1981), Indonesian retired professional footballer

Given name:
Arief Budiman (1941–2020), Muslim Chinese Indonesian sociologist and professor
Imam Arief Fadillah (born 1989), Indonesian professional footballer
Arief Hidayat (born 1956), the fifth Chief Justice of the Constitutional Court of Indonesia
Ilham Arief Sirajuddin (born 1965), Indonesian former politician, mayor of Makassar
Arief Rachadiono Wismansyah (born 1977), the mayor of Tangerang
Arief Yahya (born 1961), the former Minister of Tourism of Indonesia

See also
Arif (disambiguation)